Hillary Carlip (born October 20, 1956) is an American author and visual artist, whose work has been featured in a museum show alongside Andy Warhol and Damien Hirst. Her latest release, Find Me I’m Yours, is an interactive, multi-platform entertainment experience conceived, designed and written by Carlip, and co-created, directed, and produced by Maxine Lapiduss.

Books
Carlip's first book, Girl Power: Young Women Speak Out, was published in 1995. It was selected by the New York Public Library for inclusion on its "Best Books for Teens" list, and Hillary appeared on Oprah to promote the book.

Her second book, Zine Scene, which she designed herself and co-wrote with Francesca Lia Block, won an American Library Association Award.

Carlip's third book, Queen of the Oddballs: And Other True Stories from a Life Unaccording to Plan, was an American Booksellers Association Book Sense Pick Best Seller, a Lambda Literary Award finalist in two categories (humor and memoir), and was selected by Borders as one of the Best Literary Memoirs of 2006.

Her fourth book, A'la Cart: The Secret Lives of Grocery Shoppers (Virgin Books), received raves including a starred review from Publishers Weekly, who cited Carlip's "humor, grace and brilliantly creative eye," and called the book a "hilarious, delightful, unique achievement."

Carlip's latest release, Find Me, I’m Yours, is an interactive entertainment experience in a new genre coined by Carlip – CLICK LIT®-- conceived from the start as an ever-expanding, multi-platform creation that launched November 3, 2014.

Other creative projects
 
As a visual artist, Carlip's work has been shown at several galleries in Los Angeles, New York City, and Chicago. Her work was most recently featured alongside Andy Warhol and Damien Hirst in a museum show called Stocked: Contemporary Art from the Grocery Aisle. She is also included in the show's catalogue/book (University of Washington Press).

In 2001, Carlip founded web production and design company, Fly HC Multimedia, and she has designed and produced hundreds of award-winning, custom websites for celebrities (including Jennifer Aniston), corporations, the Australian Government, authors, web series, artists, non-profits, and more.

Carlip was the creator, editor and host of the literary website "Fresh Yarn" which hosted works written by a diverse range of writers, performers and personalities (from 2004 to 2010). She has also been an NPR commentator, having written and recorded pieces for All Things Considered. Along with Josh Kilmer-Purcell, Danielle Trussoni, and Maria Dahvana Headley, she is a founding member of The Memoirists Collective, a group that seeks new talent in nonfiction.

From 1999 to 2001 she was co-president, Founder, and Executive Creative Director of the teen web network VOXXY.

Carlip's first film script, SKIRTS, co-written with Miss Congeniality co-writer, Katie Ford, sold to Columbia Studios. She has also done script rewrites for animated films for Disney including An Extremely Goofy Movie.

Carlip was also the lead of the "all-girl, all ex-con" band Angel and the Reruns and has performed with The Flying Karamazov Brothers.

Selected bibliography
Girl Power: Young Women Speak Out (Warner Books, 1995)
Zine Scene (Girl Press, 1999)
Queen of the Oddballs: And Other True Stories from a Life Unaccording to Plan (HarperCollins, May 2006)
FIRED!: Tales of the Canned, Canceled, Downsized, & Dismissed (Simon and Schuster's Touchstone Books, 2006)
A La Cart:The Secret Lives of Grocery Shoppers (2008)
Find Me I’m Yours (RosettaBooks, November 2014)

Awards and nominations 

American Library Association
Finalist, Lambda Literary Award (humor, memoir)
Bandie Broadband Award, “Newest New Thing” (2000)
The Gong Show winner
Borders as one of the "Best Literary Memoirs of 2006"

References

External links
 Official website
 Find Me I'm Yours
 
 NPR interview with Hillary Carlip
 Fresh Yarn website
 Fly HC Multimedia

1956 births
Living people
American women screenwriters
American performance artists
21st-century American women